The fifth season of the Chinese reality talent show Sing! China premiered on 21 August 2020, on Zhejiang Television. Li Ronghao was the only coach returning from the previous season. Meanwhile, Li Jian and Nicholas Tse also returned after their one-season hiatus, replacing Harlem Yu and Wang Leehom. Li Yuchun joined the coaching panel as a new coach, replacing Na Ying.

On 21 November 2020, Shan Yichun was announced the winner of the season, making her youngest winner. In addition, with Li Jian's second win, he became the first coach to win multiple seasons. Zebra Forest from Team Li Ronghao was the runner-up. Hence, this is the first time in the history of Sing! China where a finalist is a stolen artist whom their coach did not originally turn for in the blind auditions. Pan Hong, Cao Yang and Su Yuning finished third, fourth and fifth places respectively.

Coaches and hosts
On 28 July 2020, it was announced that Nicholas Tse would be returning as a coach after a one-season hiatus. A few days later, on 31 July 2020, it was confirmed that Li Ronghao would be returning as a coach, along with Li Jian who returned after a one-season hiatus. On 18 August 2020, it was announced that Li Yuchun would be joining the trio as a new coach. Hu Qiaohua returned as a host for the season.

Teams
 Colour key

Blind auditions
In this season, a new feature was added where artists can choose to perform their original songs at any point in time, which extends the blind audition rules of Sing My Song, a show that has been cancelled after 3 seasons.

In this stage, the coaches are to recruit a total of five artists to form a team of their own, contrary to six in Season 3. The forming of the teams would move to a format that is similar to the "Six-Chair Challenge" featured in the British version of The X Factor but modified. Once a team is full with five artists occupying all the spots, the subsequent artists which the coach has successfully recruited would have to face-off with one of the five artists in the sing-offs for a spot in the team. 

The incoming artist may select any of the five defending artists to compete against in the sing-off, and both artists would each sing a new song and the coach would decide on the winner. The winner would be given the spot in the team. However, unlike Season 3, this season introduces the 'Save', where other coaches can save any losing artist from the sing offs (the same function as the steals from The Voice). The coaches are given 10 seconds to save the losing artist for elimination. If one coach presses their button, he/she will be automatically on the new coach's team and if more than one coach presses, same as with the blind auditions, the artist has the opportunity to choose which coach they want. 

For defending artists, once they have won a sing-off against an incoming artist, they would receive immunity from the subsequent sing-offs and immediately advance to the next round of the competition.

 Colour key

Episode 1 (21 August)

Episode 2 (28 August)

Episode 3 (4 September)

Episode 4 (11 September)

Episode 5 (18 September)

Sing-off details

The Cross Battles
Before the start of the Cross Battles, the coaches would decide on the appearance order of their artists, and this was done without the knowledge of their opposing coach. Therefore, all artists would not know who they are competing against until they were revealed on stage by the host. The coaches were also allowed to modify the appearance order of their artists at any point in the competition to counter the opposing artists in the remaining Cross Battles.

A total of four Cross Battles were held between two opposing coaches. At the end of each Cross Battle, the winning artist will earn one point for their team, while the losing artist would not get any points. Each of the coaches are allowed to pick an artist from their team to let the artist receive bonus points. If the artist wins, two points will be added to the team, otherwise, the artist will not receive any points.

At the end of the Cross Battles, the team with the highest number of winning points will advance to the Cross Knockouts. Meanwhile, the losing team would have to face a penalty and eliminate an artist from their team to move on to the next round of the competition.

 Colour key

 Ma Xinyi 马心怡 was absent due to a surgery, hence Zebra Forest 斑马森林 had to take her place.

The Cross Knockouts
In this round, coaches will draw to determine the order in which they can select first. That coach will choose an artist from his team and state which opposing team he wants that artist to face off against. The chosen coach from the representative team will decide his/her opponent by draw as well. Each coach is allowed one block in this round. If a coach used a "Block" on his artist, he/she may not face a certain artist from another team by default. At the end of each Cross Knockout, the two artists will receive votes of approval from a 51-person judging panel. The artist with the most votes will advance to the Playoffs, while the other would be eliminated.

For the first time, two artists from the same team competed in the cross knockouts.

 Colour key

The Playoffs
The Top 9 performed in the Playoffs for a spot in the Top 7. The order of appearance of the artists was decided through the drawing of lots by their respective coaches. In deciding who moves on, a professional judging panel made up of 50 veteran record producers, music critics, and media practitioners from various media companies; as well as the studio audience made up of 300 members of the public were given an equal say. Each of the voters was entitled to one vote per artist, and they can either choose to vote or not vote for a particular artist. The maximum score that the student will receive of the professional judging panel review is 50, and 50 for the live audiences, thus having the maximum score of was 100. Seven artists with higher overall scores advanced, while two artists with the lowest scores will be eliminated from the competition.

The Semi-finals
The Top 7 performed in the semi-finals for a slot in the finals. Just like in the playoffs, the order of appearance of the artists was decided through the drawing of lots by their respective coaches. The same voting procedure in the playoffs will be done in the semi-finals: a 50-member professional judging panel, except that there will be a 400-member audience instead of 300. Five artists with higher overall scores will advance to the final, while the other two will be eliminated.

With Zebra Forest's advancement to the final, this is the first time that a stolen artist made into the finale.

The Finals
The Top 5 performed live in a two-part season finale on 21 November, held at the Beijing National Stadium. In the first round of the competition, the five finalists performed a duet with their coach, and a solo song. Based on the public votes received from the live audience at the end of the first round, the bottom three artists with the fewest votes would be eliminated.

The final two artists would then sing their winner's song before a 100-person panel and live audience, who will vote for the winner at the end of the performances. Every member of the panel would be entitled to one vote, and the total number of votes received by the artists from the panel and live audience would be converted into percentage points accordingly. The artist who received the highest number of points would be announced as the winner.

Contestants who appeared on previous seasons or TV shows
 Song Yuning competed in third season of Sing My Song on Team Liu Huan, and was eliminated in the composer round.
 Cao Yang was featured as a celebrity guest singer in the second season, performing alongside Janice Tan. He also appeared in Season 3 of Sound of My Dream.

References

2020 in Chinese music
2020 Chinese television seasons